HMS Cumberland was a  heavy cruiser of the Royal Navy that saw action during the Second World War.

Career

Cumberland was built by Vickers-Armstrongs at Barrow-in-Furness in 1926. She served on the China Station with the 5th Cruiser Squadron from 1928 until 1938, returning to the UK in March 1935 for a refit. In 1938, she joined the 2nd cruiser squadron on the South American station.

In the South Atlantic
At the start of the Second World War in 1939, Cumberland was assigned to 2nd Cruiser Squadron Force G, the South American Division.  At the start of December she was forced to self-refit in the Falkland Islands, thus depriving the force of their strongest unit.  Without her,  and  engaged the German raider  in the Battle of the River Plate on 13 December. Cumberland received a garbled indication that a contact was being made and moved north to reinforce, arriving at the River Plate at 22:00 14 December, after steaming 1000 miles in 34 hours - . Admiral Graf Spee had put into neutral Montevideo and was trapped there, as Cumberland along with Ajax and Achilles (Exeter having been heavily damaged) patrolled the estuary, resulting in Admiral Graf Spee being scuttled by her crew on 17 December.

South African service
After this, she sailed to Simonstown, South Africa, spending between January and February undergoing a refit.  She then escorted convoys along the African coast, bound for the Middle East.  In July, she was tasked, along with her sister, with hunting down the German commerce raider  (known as Raider E to the Royal Navy).  Whilst on patrol, she intercepted the Vichy French merchant Poitiers, which had been carrying ammunition to the Ivory Coast.  Rather than see their ship fall into enemy hands, the crew promptly opened its seacocks and set fire to its cargo. Later that month, she attacked Dakar, suffering damage from a French coastal battery. In December, Cumberland was again hunting for the merchant raider Thor, but the search proved unsuccessful.

Arctic convoys
In October 1941, Cumberland joined the 1st Cruiser Squadron Home Fleet escorting the Arctic convoys until January 1944, winning the battle honour Arctic 1942-1943.

In the Far East

She was then transferred to the Far East, as part of 4th Cruiser Squadron Eastern Fleet. In September, she carried out raids on Northern Sumatra. During this period, Cumberland won the battle honours Sabang 1944 and Burma 1945.  On 7 February 1945, Cumberland was back in Simonstown to have her rudder removed.

Postwar
She returned to the United Kingdom on 12 November 1945 and transported troops until June 1946, when she was placed in reserve until 1949.  She was then refitted at Devonport (1949–1951) for further service as a gunnery trials ship. She lost her 8-inch turrets, and for a few years had a prototype dual 6-inch automatic turret (testing the concept for later installation in the then building s) in 'B' position, and a prototype automatic dual 3-inch turret (also slated for the Tigers) in 'X' position.  For the 1956 film The Battle of the River Plate, Cumberland played herself, arriving with unexpected speed from the Falklands after the battle, to replace the damaged . Although she was without her 8-inch gun turrets at this time and was refitted with lattice masts, she is very recognisable as the last of the three-funnelled heavy cruisers to remain in service. (In the final scenes,  represented Cumberland as one of the British trio patrolling off Montevideo).

Between 1955 and 1956, HMS Cumberland was fitted with a number of trial anti-A-bomb and anti-H-bomb defences. Her first voyage in this configuration was delayed after some "defects" were found in her engine room, which were not explained as normal mechanical faults. In April 1956, having set sail on another secret test mission, she returned to port within 36 hours, following another unexplained "defect" in her main gearbox. Sabotage was suspected.

HMS Cumberland finally paid off in 1958, arriving at Cashmore's, Newport, on 3 November 1958 for scrapping.

Painting
In 1926, HMS Cumberland was the subject of a watercolour by the maritime artist A.B. Cull. Although most of Cull's work was destroyed during air raids on Britain during World War II, a small number of his works survived, and they are now on display in the National Maritime Museum's collection. However, his painting of HMS Cumberland is held in a private collection in Australia.

References and notes

Sources

External links

 HMS Cumberland. History
 HMS Cumberland exercising her anti-fallout 'pre-wetting' system

 

Kent-class cruisers
County-class cruisers of the Royal Navy
Ships built in Barrow-in-Furness
1926 ships
World War II cruisers of the United Kingdom
Battle of the River Plate